Araeomolis propinqua is a moth of the family Erebidae. It was described by French entomologist Hervé de Toulgoët in 1998. It is found in French Guiana and Venezuela.

References

Phaegopterina
Moths described in 1998
Moths of South America